Fighting robots can refer to:
Military robots
Robot Fighting League
Rock 'Em Sock 'Em Robots
BattleBots
Robotica

See also
Robot combat
Robot Wars (disambiguation)